Sergey Aleksandrovich Betov ( Siarhiej Betaŭ; ; born 15 October 1987) is a Belarusian tennis player competing on the ATP Challenger Tour. He reached his highest ATP singles ranking of 340 on 1 August 2011 and his highest doubles ranking of 61 was achieved on 26 October 2015. 

On April 29, 2016, the International Tennis Federation found that Betov had committed an Anti-Doping Rule Violation in connection with the consumption of meldonium, but further determined that he bore no fault or negligence for the violation and therefore permitted him to resume competition.

He married Russian tennis player Margarita Gasparyan in July 2021; they announced their pregnancy in February 2022.

ITF finals (45-34)

Singles (5-9)

Doubles (40-25)

References

External links
 
 
 

1987 births
Living people
Belarusian male tennis players
Universiade medalists in tennis
Doping cases in tennis
Universiade silver medalists for Belarus
Universiade bronze medalists for Belarus
21st-century Belarusian people